Samuelle Lynne Acosta Pinto-Semerad (born December 11, 1989), better known for her screen name Sam Pinto, is a Filipina actress and commercial model.

Career

Modelling career
Sam started out as a print-ad and TV commercial model. At the age of 10, she got her first modelling job, appearing in the posters for Coca-Cola. Other TV and print-ad credits include Sunsilk, SMART, Voice combo sandwich, Colgate, Palmolive, and Mc Donald's. She was also an endorser for a clothing brand, BAYO.

Pinoy Big Brother

She became known to people after being a part of the reality series, Pinoy Big Brother: Double Up. Originally a House B housemate, she moved to House A after a week of her stay inside Big Brother's House. She has been saved by her fans through voting on several eviction nights before finally getting the boot on the night of January 9, 2010.

Early TV appearances
Before her stint on the reality show, she was seen acting with Mark Herras on a Maynila episode in GMA Network. She was also a finalist in the Myx VJ Search 2008. Her first regular appearance was in a television show called Midnight DJ, opposite Oyo Boy Sotto. She joined the show as a cast regular in the middle of season 4. She played Max, the Midnight DJ crew's resident psychic. Her character was first introduced in the "Oink! Oink!" episode.

Music career
Pinto was featured on Shehyee's single Trip Lang in 2013.

ABS-CBN
Sam has been dubbed as the 'IT-girl of the moment'. She has appeared on the cover of various magazines such as Woman Today, Gadgets Magazine, and most notably the covergirl for the July issue of FHM magazine in 2010.

She played Amanda, a "mangkukulam" and Elias' (Jake Cuenca) love interest in the weekly primetime series Agimat Presents: Elias Paniki in ABS-CBN. Sam will soon be seen on the big screen via Petrang Kabayo, a remake of the popular 80's film, with Vice Ganda in the titular role.

GMA
After endless rumours and speculation of her transfer to ABS-CBN's rival network, Sam herself confirmed the news in her Twitter account: "Thank you KAPUSO family for welcoming me! I'm so excited. So finally I can answer, yes I'm a KAPUSO now :)." She signed a three-year exclusive contract with the Kapuso channel and starring in several upcoming shows of GMA Network.

Sam played Samara, a warrior princess, in the 2010 Official Entry to the Metro Manila Film Festival, Si Agimat at Si Enteng Kabisote. The movie is top-billed by Sen. Bong Revilla and Vic Sotto; Sam played the former's love interest.

FHM
In 2011 and 2012, she was voted as FHM Philippines' Sexiest Woman in the World. In 2013, she was beaten to the top spot by Marian Rivera on her third attempt (similar to Katrina Halili's third attempt in 2008), and fell to second place until 2014. As Rivera vacated her crown, she faced Ellen Adarna and fellow Bubble Shaker Andrea Torres who became a heavy favourite. However, she fell to the fourth spot in 2015 which was won by Jennylyn Mercado.

Personal life
Pinto was in a relationship with football player Misagh Bahadoran from December 2015 until 2018. In October 2018, she revealed through Instagram that her new boyfriend is basketball player Anthony Semerad. They got engaged in November 2019 in Australia and were married in a civil ceremony on March 8, 2021. On May 5, 2021, she announced on Instagram they are expecting their first child. Days later, they revealed that its a baby girl.

Filmography

Television

Film

Awards and nominations

References

External links

1989 births
Living people
TV5 (Philippine TV network) personalities
ABS-CBN personalities
GMA Network personalities
Actresses from Metro Manila
Filipina gravure idols
People from Parañaque
Pinoy Big Brother contestants
Star Magic
Viva Artists Agency
VJs (media personalities)